Vrinë is a village in the former Xarrë municipality, Vlorë County in Albania. At the 2015 local government reform it became part of the municipality Konispol.

Demographics 

Vrinë is a new village established during the communist period and is populated by Muslim Albanians (400), Orthodox Albanians (318) and Greeks (300). Additionally Shkallë is inhabited by an Aromanian majority with minorities of Muslim Albanians and Greeks.

References

Populated places in Konispol
Villages in Vlorë County